Wriezen station is a railway station in the municipality of Wriezen, located in the Märkisch-Oderland district in Brandenburg, Germany.

References

Railway stations in Brandenburg
Railway stations in Germany opened in 1866
1866 establishments in Prussia
Buildings and structures in Märkisch-Oderland